Fouquieria is a genus of 11 species of desert plants, the sole genus in the family Fouquieriaceae.  The genus includes the ocotillo (F. splendens) and the Boojum tree or cirio (F. columnaris). They have semisucculent stems with thinner spikes projecting from them, with leaves on the bases spikes. They are unrelated to cacti and do not look much like them; their stems are proportionately thinner than cactus stems and their leaves are larger.

Taxonomy

Taxonomic history 
Fouquieria species do not have a particularly close resemblance to any other sort of plants; genetic evidence has shown they belong in the Ericales. Before this, they had been variously placed in the Violales or their own order, Fouquieriales.

The Seri people identify three species of Fouquieria in their area of Mexico:  jomjéeziz or xomjéeziz (F. splendens), jomjéeziz caacöl (F. diguetii, Baja California tree ocotillo), and cototaj (F. columnaris, boojum).

Etymology 
The genus is named after French physician Pierre Fouquier (1776-1850).

Ecology 
Fouquieria shrevei is endemic to the Cuatro Ciénegas Basin in Mexico, and is unusual in possessing vertical resinous wax bands on the stems, and exhibits gypsophily, the ability to grow on soils with a high concentration of gypsum. It has aromatic white flowers and is presumed to be moth-pollinated. Other species in the genus with orange or red flowers are pollinated by hummingbirds or carpenter bees. Fouquieria diguetii is host to a peacock mite, Tuckerella eloisae.

The spines of Fouquieria develop in an unusual way, from a woody thickening on the outer (lower) side of the leaf petiole, which remains after the leaf blade and most of the petiole separate and fall from the plant.

Distribution and habitat 
These plants are native to northern Mexico and the bordering US states of Arizona, southern California, New Mexico, and parts of southwestern Texas, favoring low, arid hillsides.

Species

References

External links
The Fouquieria Page at the National University of Mexico with photos of the species in the wild
 Fouquieriaceae in L. Watson and M.J. Dallwitz (1992 onwards). The families of flowering plants.

 
Ericales genera